

Major bridges

Notes and References 
 

 Others references

See also 

 Transport in Laos
 Rail transport in Laos
 List of crossings of the Mekong River
 Geography of Laos

External links 
 
 

Laos
 
Bridges
Bridges